Earle Wilson (February 4, 1901 – May 23, 1989) was an American athlete. He competed in the men's triple jump at the 1924 Summer Olympics.

References

External links
 

1901 births
1989 deaths
Athletes (track and field) at the 1924 Summer Olympics
American male triple jumpers
Olympic track and field athletes of the United States
Place of birth missing